Half Life: A Parable for the Nuclear Age is a 1985 Australian documentary film directed by Dennis O'Rourke, concerning the American Castle Bravo nuclear testing at the Marshall Islands in 1954.

The film features interviews with residents of the nearby Rongelap and Utirik Atolls who were affected by nuclear fallout from the tests. Unlike in previous nuclear tests and despite the considerably more powerful nuclear explosion involved, these residents were not relocated to a safer location. Declassified American military footage is included in the production.

Awards
In 1986 the film won the Peace Film Award at the Berlin International Film Festival.

See also
Radio Bikini
Operation Crossroads

References

Further reading

External links

Half Life: A Parable for the Nuclear Age at the Australian screen

1985 films
Australian documentary films
Documentary films about nuclear war and weapons
1985 documentary films
1980s English-language films